Vytautas Vaičikonis is a Lithuanian sprint canoer who has competed since the mid-1990s. He won few junior titles, silver medal in the K-1 200 m at the 2007 ICF Canoe Sprint World Championships in Duisburg and gold medal in the K1-200 m at the 2008 ICF Canoe Sprint European Championships in Milan. Also he was medalist at various World Cup events and other races.

References

Lithuanian male canoeists
Living people
Year of birth missing (living people)
ICF Canoe Sprint World Championships medalists in kayak
Sportspeople from Panevėžys